The River Plate Championships or Campeonatos de Río de la Plata  also known as the River Plate International Championships or Campeonatos Internacionales de River Plate was a men's and women's clay court tennis tournament founded in 1893 as the  Buenos Aires LTC Open. In 1894 the tournaments title was changed to the Championship of the River Plate. It was first held Buenos Aires Lawn Tennis Club, Buenos Aires, Argentina. The tournament ran until 1978 when it ceased to be an official event of the international tennis circuit, but it did continue for another twenty years until it was abolished in 1998.

History
In 1893 the Buenos Aires Lawn Tennis Club organized its first tournament the Buenos Aires LTC Open, to members of all sports club with the Río de la Plata area, but was mainly played by local players. The mens event was only the championship category of the first edition. The inugural mens event was won by Frank Murray Still who beat Thomas Vesey Melville Knox ​​in the final. The BALTC later validated the first tournaments winner in the roll of honor for the River Plate Championships.

The River Plate Championships was the first important international tennis tournament to be held in Argentina, pre dating the Championship of Argentina by 37 years. The final mens winner was Argentina's José Luis Clerc who beat New Zealand player in the final Chris Lewis. The women's championship did not start until 1903 which was won by Argentine player Miss Chawner who defeated fellow Argentine player Winnifred M. Boadle. The final women's champion was American player Caroline Stoll who beat Argentina's Emilse Raponi de Longo in the final. The tournament ceased to be an official event of the worldwide international tennis circuit, but it did continue for another twenty years until it was abolished in 1998.

Finals

Mens singles
Included:

References

Clay court tennis tournaments
Defunct tennis tournaments in Argentina